Sony Pictures Classics Inc. is an American film production and distribution company that is a division of Sony Pictures. It was founded in 1992 by former Orion Classics heads Michael Barker, Tom Bernard and Marcie Bloom.<ref name="SPC at 15">{{cite web|url=http://www.hollywoodreporter.com/news/sony-pictures-classics-at-15-139749|title=Sony Pictures Classics at 15|first=Anne|last=Thompson|date=October 17, 2006|publisher=The Hollywood Reporter|archive-url=https://web.archive.org/web/20120209021120/http://www.hollywoodreporter.com/news/sony-pictures-classics-at-15-139749|archive-date=February 9, 2012|url-status=live|access-date=March 4, 2010|quote="They stay behind the films and manage to find a significant core audience for a large number of them, with the occasional $130 million blowout like Crouching Tiger, Hidden Dragon,''' [former United Artists president Bingham] Ray says. 'But they spend a fraction of what a major studio would spend to get the same number. Their philosophy is not to pile a lot of money on everything. They run a tight ship; they don't have an army of people working for them. They keep things simple."}} Alt URL</ref> It distributes, produces and acquires specialty films such as documentaries, independent and arthouse films in the United States and internationally. As of 2015, Barker and Bernard are co-presidents of the division.

 History 

Sony Pictures Classics was formed in 1992, by Michael Barker, Tom Bernard, and Marcie Bloom, set up as an autonomous division of Sony Pictures. The model of the company is to produce, acquire and/or distribute independent films from the United States and internationally.

Sony Pictures Classics has released prestigious films that have won 37 Academy Awards and garnered 155 Academy Award nominations, including Best Picture nominations for The Father, Call Me By Your Name, Whiplash, Amour, Midnight in Paris, An Education, Capote, Howards End, and Crouching Tiger, Hidden Dragon.

Sony Pictures Classics has a history of making reasonable investments for small films, and getting a decent return. It has a history of not overspending. Its largest commercial success of the 2010s is Woody Allen's Midnight in Paris (2011), which grossed over $56 million in the U.S., becoming Allen's highest-grossing film ever in the United States.

Sony Pictures Classics has been a pioneer in theatrical distribution.

In 2001, Sony Pictures Classics championed foreign-language film Crouching Tiger, Hidden Dragon and it earned the most Oscar nominations ever for a non-English-language film going on to win the best foreign-language film Oscar and Golden Globe in 2001 — and at the box office, garnering more than $213 million worldwide on a $17 million budget, including $128 million in the U.S. as a Sony Pictures Classics release.

In 2006, SPC promoted The Lives of Others'' to an Oscar and BAFTA, after the movie had been rejected by Cannes, Berlin, Venice and the New York Film Festival.

Occasionally, Sony Pictures Classics agrees to release films for all other film studio divisions of Sony; however, under Sony Pictures Classics' structure within Sony, all other divisions of Sony (including the parent company) cannot force Sony Pictures Classics to release any film that the division does not want to release.

Film library

References

External links 
 

Entertainment companies established in 1992
Classics
Pictures Classics
Sony Pictures Entertainment Motion Picture Group
Film distributors of the United States
Film production companies of the United States
American independent film studios
Companies based in Los Angeles
Companies based in New York City
American companies established in 1992
1992 establishments in California